The 2003-04 First Division season was the 36th of the amateur  competition of the first-tier football in the Gambia.  The tournament was organized by the Gambian Football Association (GFA) .  The season began on 16 December 2003 and finished on 20 June 2004, this was their next in two years.  Wallidan FC won the fourteenth title and finished with 38 points, Wallidan qualified and competed in the 2005 CAF Champions League the following season.  As Wallidan won the 2004 Gambian Cup, second placed cup winner Armed Forces FC participated in the 2005 CAF Confederation Cup the following season..

Armed Forces FC was the defending team of the title. Wallidan finished with 38 points.  Hawks FC scored the most goals and numbered 32.

Participating clubs

 Wallidan FC
 Steve Biko  FC
 Real de Banjul
 Tallinding United - Promoted from the Second Division
 Hawks FC

 Gambia Ports Authority FC
 Armed Forces  FC
 Bakau United FC
 Sait Matty FC
 Starlight Banjul - Promoted from the Second Division

Overview
The league was contested by 10 teams with Wallidan FC again winning the championship.

League standings

See also
GFA League First Division

Footnotes

External links
Historic results at rsssf.com

Gambia
GFA League First Division seasons
First
First